Stilbaai, also known as the Bay of Sleeping Beauty, is a town along the southern coast of South Africa about four hours by car from Cape Town. It is part of the Hessequa Local Municipality in the Western Cape province. Alternate spellings of the town's name include Stillbaai.

History
Stilbaai is host to a number of interesting archaeological sites, including ancient fish traps thought to have been built by early ancestors of the Khoi people of the Southern Cape, and a shell landfill that has been carbon dated to around 1000 BC.

Another archaeological site is situated in a group of caves at Blombos cave, about 12 kilometres from Stilbaai. Artifacts found at Blombos have been carbon dated to around 77,000 BP, making it the oldest known human settlement today.

Geography

Climate
Stilbaai has a temperate climate and receives almost the same amount of rainfall in all four seasons, with peaks in autumn and spring.
Temperature averages between 20° and 28° Celsius in the summer and between 12° and 20° Celsius in the winter. Rainfall is 639,2 mm per annum on average.

Parks and greenspace
Stilbaai owns a large selection of nature reserves. To the east is Pauline Bohnen Nature Reserve, a large reserve with various hiking routes. The Skulpiesbaai Nature Reserve is situated near the harbour and reaches up to the "Noordkapperpunt" fishponds. The Geelkrants Nature Reserve is situated next to the "Pulpit".

See also
Stillbay  period  around 71,000 BP in the Middle Stone Age named after an archeological site.
Oswego-Guardian/Texanita collision

References

External links

Stilbaai Facebook Group
Stilbaai Facebook Group
Stilbaai-Tourism & Business info
Directory of businesses in Stilbaai
Stilbaai Tourism
Stilbaai Business Chamber
Stilbaai Information Website

Populated places in the Hessequa Local Municipality
Populated coastal places in South Africa